Hainesville is the name of several communities in the U.S. state of West Virginia.

Hainesville, Berkeley County, West Virginia
Hainesville, Hampshire County, West Virginia